The 1964 Soviet Cup was an association football cup competition of the Soviet Union. The winner of the competition, Dinamo Kiev qualified for the continental tournament for the first time among all Soviet clubs.

Competition schedule

Preliminary stage

Group 1 (Russian Federation)

Preliminary round
 Khimik Novomoskovsk           1-2  SATURN Rybinsk

First round
 Avangard Kolomna              0-1  DINAMO Bryansk  
 Baltika Kaliningrad           1-2  TRALFLOTOVETS Murmansk 
 GRANITAS Klaipeda             3-1  Metallurg Cherepovets 
 KHIMIK Klin                   1-0  Textilshchik Ivanovo 
 Saturn Rybinsk                1-4  TEKMASH Kostroma 
 Spartak Smolensk              1-2  SPARTAK Petrozavodsk  
 ZVEJNIEKS Liepaja             w/o  Spartak Leningrad 
 ZVEZDA Serpukhov              2-1  Sputnik Kaluga

Quarterfinals
 Dinamo Bryansk                1-1  Zvezda Serpukhov 
 Khimik Klin                   1-2  TEKMASH Kostroma  
 SPARTAK Petrozavodsk          1-0  Tralflotovets Murmansk 
 Zvejnieks Liepaja             0-0  Granitas Klaipeda

Quarterfinals replays
 Dinamo Bryansk                0-3  ZVEZDA Serpukhov 
 Zvejnieks Liepaja             0-1  GRANITAS Klaipeda

Semifinals
 GRANITAS Klaipeda             2-1  Spartak Petrozavodsk 
 Zvezda Serpukhov              1-2  TEKMASH Kostroma

Final
 Granitas Klaipeda             1-2  TEKMASH Kostroma

Group 2 (Russian Federation)

Preliminary round
 SERP I MOLOT Moskva           3-0  Spartak Saransk

First round
 METALLURG Tula                3-1  Zvezda Perm 
 PROGRESS Zelyonodolsk         7-1  Volga Ulyanovsk 
 Spartak Ryazan                0-1  DINAMO Kirov 
 Spartak Yoshkar-Ola           0-3  SERP I MOLOT Moskva 
 TORPEDO Pavlovo               1-0  Khimik Berezniki 
 TRAKTOR Vladimir              4-1  Khimik Dzerzhinsk 
 TRUD Noginsk                  3-2  Zenit Izhevsk 
 ZNAMYA TRUDA Orekhovo-Zuyevo  4-1  Iskra Kazan

Quarterfinals
 DINAMO Kirov                  3-1  Traktor Vladimir 
 METALLURG Tula                1-0  Trud Noginsk 
 Progress Zelyonodolsk         0-1  ZNAMYA TRUDA Orekhovo-Zuyevo 
 SERP I MOLOT Moskva           4-1  Torpedo Pavlovo

Semifinals
 METALLURG Tula                1-0  Serp i Molot Moskva 
 ZNAMYA TRUDA Orekhovo-Zuyevo  4-0  Dinamo Kirov

Final
 ZNAMYA TRUDA Orekhovo-Zuyevo  2-0  Metallurg Tula              [aet]

Group 3 (Russian Federation)

First round
 ENERGIYA Volzhskiy            2-1  Metallurg Kuibyshev 
 PROGRESS Kamensk              5-1  Neftyanik Syzran 
 ROSTSELMASH Rostov-na-Donu    4-0  Torpedo Lipetsk 
 Shakhtyor Shakhty             0-1  TRUD Penza 
 Torpedo Armavir               0-0  Spartak Tambov 
 TORPEDO Taganrog              2-0  Spartak Belgorod 
 TRUDOVIYE REZERVY Kursk       3-0  Spartak Oryol 
 VOLGAR Astrakhan              2-1  Sokol Saratov

First round replays
 TORPEDO Armavir               2-0  Spartak Tambov

Quarterfinals
 ENERGIYA Volzhskiy            2-1  Volgar Astrakhan 
 ROSTSELMASH Rostov-na-Donu    3-1  Torpedo Armavir 
 TRUD Penza                    0-1  Progress Kamensk  
 Trudoviye Rezervy Kursk       0-0  Torpedo Taganrog

Quarterfinals replays
 TRUDOVIYE REZERVY Kursk       5-1  Torpedo Taganrog

Semifinals
 Trud Penza                    1-1  RostSelMash Rostov-na-Donu 
 TRUDOVIYE REZERVY Kursk       1-0  Energiya Volzhskiy

Semifinals replays
 Trud Penza                    1-1  RostSelMash Rostov-na-Donu 
 Trud Penza                    2-2  ROSTSELMASH Rostov-na-Donu  [by draw]

Final
 ROSTSELMASH Rostov-na-Donu    3-0  Trudoviye Rezervy Kursk

Group 4 (Russian Federation)

Preliminary round
 ALAZANI Gurjaani              3-1  Dinamo Baku 
 LORI Kirovakan                1-0  Lernagorts Kafan

First round
 CEMENT Novorossiysk           2-1  Trudoviye Rezervy Kislovodsk 
 DINAMO Batumi                 2-1  Metallurg Rustavi 
 DINAMO Kirovabad              2-0  Alazani Gurjaani 
 DINAMO Makhachkala            2-0  Spartak Nalchik 
 DINAMO Sukhumi                3-1  Kolkhida Poti 
 SHIRAK Leninakan              1-0  Lori Kirovakan 
 Spartak Orjonikidze           1-2  DINAMO Stavropol 
 TEREK Grozny                  4-0  Urozhai Maykop

Quarterfinals
 DINAMO Batumi                 2-0  Shirak Leninakan 
 DINAMO Stavropol              2-1  Dinamo Kirovabad 
 DINAMO Sukhumi                2-1  Cement Novorossiysk 
 TEREK Grozny                  3-0  Dinamo Makhachkala

Semifinals
 DINAMO Sukhumi                1-0  Dinamo Batumi 
 TEREK Grozny                  3-1  Dinamo Stavropol

Final
 TEREK Grozny                  1-0  Dinamo Sukhumi

Group 5 (Russian Federation)

Preliminary round
 Metallist Jambul              0-0  Dinamo Tselinograd

Preliminary round replays
 Metallist Jambul              1-2  DINAMO Tselinograd

First round
 Dinamo Tselinograd            0-0  Lokomotiv Orenburg  
 Metallurg Chimkent            2-2  Stroitel Ufa 
 NEFTYANIK Fergana             1-0  Metallurg Magnitogorsk 
 Pamir Leninabad               0-0  Priboi Tyumen 
 POLITOTDEL Tashkent Region    2-0  Torpedo Miass 
 SALYUT Kamensk-Uralskiy       4-2  Khimik Chirchik 
 SPARTAK Andizhan              3-2  Uralets Nizhniy Tagil 
 SPARTAK Samarkand             1-0  Stroitel Kurgan

First round replays
 Dinamo Tselinograd            0-2  LOKOMOTIV Orenburg 
 METALLURG Chimkent            1-0  Stroitel Ufa 
 PAMIR Leninabad               2-0  Priboi Tyumen

Quarterfinals
 LOKOMOTIV Orenburg            2-1  Metallurg Chimkent 
 NEFTYANIK Fergana             3-1  Spartak Andizhan 
 PAMIR Leninabad               1-0  Spartak Samarkand 
 POLITOTDEL Tashkent Region    3-1  Salyut Kamensk-Uralskiy

Semifinals
 NEFTYANIK Fergana             2-1  Pamir Leninabad 
 POLITOTDEL Tashkent Region    1-0  Lokomotiv Orenburg

Final
 NEFTYANIK Fergana             1-0  Politotdel Tashkent Region

Group 6 (Russian Federation)

Preliminary round
 Lokomotiv Krasnoyarsk         2-2  Armeyets Ulan-Ude 
 Start Angarsk                 0-1  TEMP Barnaul

Preliminary round replays
 LOKOMOTIV Krasnoyarsk         3-1  Armeyets Ulan-Ude

First round
 AMUR Blagoveshchensk          2-0  Avangard Komsomolsk-na-Amure 
 ANGARA Irkutsk                1-0  Zabaikalets Chita 
 CEMENTNIK Semipalatinsk       1-0  SibSelMash Novosibirsk 
 Irtysh Omsk                   2-2  Shakhtyor Prokopyevsk 
 LOKOMOTIV Krasnoyarsk         2-0  Temp Barnaul 
 LUCH Vladivostok              1-0  SKA Khabarovsk              [aet] 
 Torpedo Rubtsovsk             2-2  Vostok Ust-Kamenogorsk 
 TORPEDO Tomsk                 2-1  Khimik Kemerovo

First round replays
 IRTYSH Omsk                   1-0  Shakhtyor Prokopyevsk 
 TORPEDO Rubtsovsk             2-0  Vostok Ust-Kamenogorsk

Quarterfinals
 CEMENTNIK Semipalatinsk       2-0  Torpedo Rubtsovsk 
 IRTYSH Omsk                   2-0  Torpedo Tomsk 
 LOKOMOTIV Krasnoyarsk         2-1  Angara Irkutsk 
 LUCH Vladivostok              4-1  Amur Blagoveshchensk

Semifinals
 CEMENTNIK Semipalatinsk       1-0  Irtysh Omsk 
 LOKOMOTIV Krasnoyarsk         2-1  Luch Vladivostok

Final
 LOKOMOTIV Krasnoyarsk         3-1  Cementnik Semipalatinsk

Group 1 (Ukraine)

First round
 AVANGARD Ternopol             2-0  Volyn Lutsk 
 DESNA Chernigov               1-0  Dvina Vitebsk 
 KOLHOSPNIK Rovno              1-0  Spartak Brest 
 POLESYE Zhitomir              1-0  Dinamo Khmelnitskiy 
 SKA Lvov                      2-1  Spartak Mogilyov 
 SPARTAK Ivano-Frankovsk       1-0  Neftyanik Drogobych 
 SPARTAK Sumy                  2-1  Temp Kiev 
 VERKHOVINA Uzhgorod           1-0  Neman Grodno

Quarterfinals
 AVANGARD Ternopol             2-1  Kolhospnik Rovno 
 DESNA Chernigov               w/o  Polesye Zhitomir 
 SKA Lvov                      4-2  Verkhovina Uzhgorod 
 SPARTAK Sumy                  3-0  Spartak Ivano-Frankovsk

Semifinals
 DESNA Chernigov               4-1  Spartak Sumy 
 SKA Lvov                      4-1  Avangard Ternopol

Final
 SKA Lvov                      3-0  Desna Chernigov

Group 2 (Ukraine)

First round
 AVANGARD Chernovtsy           3-1  Dnepr Kremenchug 
 Avangard Zholtyye Vody        1-2  SKA Kiev  
 DUNAYETS Izmail               w/o  Nistrul Bendery 
 LOKOMOTIV Vinnitsa            3-2  Stroitel Beltsy 
 Luchaferul Tiraspol           1-2  ZVEZDA Kirovograd  
 Shakhtyor Alexandria          0-1  KOLHOSPNIK Cherkassy 
 STROITEL Kherson              1-0  Kolhospnik Poltava 
 Sudostroitel Nikolayev        0-1  CHAIKA Balaklava

Quarterfinals
 CHAIKA Balaklava              1-0  Stroitel Kherson 
 LOKOMOTIV Vinnitsa            3-1  Dunayets Izmail 
 SKA Kiev                      3-0  Kolhospnik Cherkassy 
 ZVEZDA Kirovograd             4-1  Avangard Chernovtsy

Semifinals
 SKA Kiev                      4-0  Chaika Balaklava 
 ZVEZDA Kirovograd             2-1  Lokomotiv Vinnitsa

Final
 SKA Kiev                      2-0  Zvezda Kirovograd

Group 3 (Ukraine)

First round
 AZOVSTAL Zhdanov              1-0  Avangard Kramatorsk 
 GORNYAK Krivoi Rog            3-0  Metallurg Kerch 
 KHIMIK Severodonetsk          1-0  Dneprovets Dneprodzerzhinsk 
 Kommunarets Kommunarsk        0-1  SHAKHTYOR Kadiyevka  
 LOKOMOTIV Donetsk             2-1  Shakhtyor Gorlovka 
 SKF Sevastopol                4-1  Burevestnik Melitopol 
 TAVRIA Simferopol             3-0  Industry Yenakiyevo 
 Torpedo Kharkov               1-1  Trubnik Nikopol

First round replays
 TORPEDO Kharkov               1-0  Trubnik Nikopol

Quarterfinals
 GORNYAK Krivoi Rog            3-0  Lokomotiv Donetsk 
 KHIMIK Severodonetsk          2-0  Torpedo Kharkov 
 Shakhtyor Kadiyevka           3-4  SKF Sevastopol  
 Tavria Simferopol             0-0  AzovStal Zhdanov

Quarterfinals replays
 Tavria Simferopol             1-1  AzovStal Zhdanov 
 TAVRIA Simferopol             2-1  AzovStal Zhdanov

Semifinals
 GORNYAK Krivoi Rog            2-0  Khimik Severodonetsk 
 SKF Sevastopol                5-2  Tavria Simferopol           [aet]

Final
 SKF Sevastopol                2-0  Gornyak Krivoi Rog

Final stage

Preliminary round
 [May 26] 
 ALGA Frunze                   2-1  UralMash Sverdlovsk 
 CHERNOMORETS Odessa           1-0  Dinamo Leningrad 
 SKA Kiev                      0-1  KARPATY Lvov 
 SKA Lvov                      2-0  Traktor Volgograd 
 STROITEL Ashkhabad            2-1  Dinamo Tallinn

First round
 [May 26] 
 ENERGETIK Dushanbe            3-1  Daugava Riga 
   [K.Kuzyayev, R.Hamidov, S.Sultanov - ?] 
 [May 27] 
 SKA Odessa                    0-1  TRUD Voronezh 
   [V.Proskurin 45] 
 [May 28] 
 LOKOMOTIV Krasnoyarsk         1-0  Avangard Kharkov 
   [Anatoliy Sharygin 10] 
 ZARYA Lugansk                 4-0  SKA Novosibirsk 
   [V.Petrov 45, Y.Priymak 50 pen, I.Balaba 65, M.Ivanov 90] 
 [May 31] 
 LOKOMOTIV Chelyabinsk         2-0  Shakhtyor Karaganda 
   [G.Yepishin, V.Korotayev] 
 LOKOMOTIV Moskva              4-0  Lokomotiv Tbilisi           [aet] 
   [Valeriy Latyshev-2, Lev Gorshkov, Boris Oreshnikov] 
 Neftyanik Fergana             1-1  Metallurg Zaporozhye 
 SKA Lvov                      6-2  Dnepr Dnepropetrovsk 
   [Pfeiffer-2, Sekech, Puzach, Shandor, Batalin – Pivikov-2] 
 SKF Sevastopol                2-1  Volga Kalinin 
 TekMash Kostroma              0-1  ŽALGIRIS Vilnius 
 TEREK Grozny                  5-2  Ararat Yerevan 
 Znamya Truda Orekhovo-Zuyevo  0-2  KUBAN Krasnodar 
 [Jun 1] 
 KARPATY Lvov                  1-0  Stroitel Ashkhabad 
 ROSTSELMASH Rostov-na-Donu    1-0  Pahtakor Tashkent 
   [Mosalyov] 
 [Jun 2] 
 CHERNOMORETS Odessa           2-0  Alga Frunze 
   [A.Koldakov, V.Deryabin]

First round replays
 [Jun 1] 
 NEFTYANIK Fergana             2-1  Metallurg Zaporozhye

Second round
 [May 31] 
 Trud Voronezh                 0-3  KAYRAT Alma-Ata 
   [Leonid Ostroushko, Vladimir Skulkin, Sergei Kvochkin] 
 [Jun 3] 
 Lokomotiv Krasnoyarsk         0-1  DINAMO Tbilisi 
   [Vladimir Barkaia 87] 
 [Jun 4] 
 Terek Grozny                  1-2  SHAKHTYOR Donetsk 
   [Dyachenko ? – Anatoliy Korshunov 35, Anatoliy Rodin 39] 
 Zarya Lugansk                 1-2  KRYLYA SOVETOV Kuibyshev 
   [Ivanov 52 – Abdulmanov 4, Nikolai Osyanin 82] 
 ŽALGIRIS Vilnius              1-0  Torpedo Moskva 
   [Leonardas Žukauskas 87] 
 [Jun 5] 
 Karpaty Lvov                  0-1  SHINNIK Yaroslavl 
   [V.Artemyev] 
 LOKOMOTIV Chelyabinsk         3-2  Moldova Kishinev            [aet] 
   [V.Korotayev-2 (1 pen), G.Yepishin – Valeriy Kolbasyuk, Vladimir Tsinkler] 
 RostSelMash Rostov-na-Donu    0-0  SKA Rostov-na-Donu  
 [Jun 8] 
 Chernomorets Odessa           0-1  ZENIT Leningrad 
   [Anatoliy Markov 64] 
 Neftyanik Fergana             0-1  DINAMO Kiev 
   [Valeriy Verigin 70] 
 SKF Sevastopol                1-0  Torpedo Kutaisi 
   [Smirnov 82] 
 [Jun 10] 
 Dinamo Minsk                  1-2  CSKA Moskva 
   [Yuriy Pogalnikov 80 pen – Boris Kazakov 20, 67] 
 Dinamo Moskva                 1-1  Lokomotiv Moskva 
   [Valeriy Fadeyev 32 – Yuriy Ivanov 67] 
 Energetik Dushanbe            1-3  NEFTYANIK Baku 
   [Y.Pekshev – Adamas Golodets-3] 
 Kuban Krasnodar               1-4  SPARTAK Moskva 
   [Gorin 5 – Vyacheslav Ambartsumyan 31, 47, 83, Yuriy Falin 74] 
 SKA Lvov                      3-1  Volga Gorkiy 
   [Sekech, Puzach, Pfeiffer – Dmitrasevich (S) og]

Second round replays
 [Jun 6] 
 RostSelMash Rostov-na-Donu    1-2  SKA Rostov-na-Donu 
   [Yuriy Mosalyov 78 – Vladimir Kazachek 72, 80] 
 [Jun 11] 
 DINAMO Moskva                 2-1  Lokomotiv Moskva 
   [Yuriy Avrutskiy 55, 72 – Kleshchov 23]

Third round
 [Jun 11] 
 Shakhtyor Donetsk             1-2  KRYLYA SOVETOV Kuibyshev 
   [Anatoliy Rodin ? – V.Grishin 12, Biryuchevskiy 32] 
 SHINNIK Yaroslavl             1-0  Zenit Leningrad             [aet] 
   [Alexandr Lenyov 95] 
 [Jun 14] 
 SKA Rostov-na-Donu            0-1  SKA Lvov 
   [S.Sekech 59] 
 [Jun 17] 
 CSKA Moskva                   2-1  SKF Sevastopol              [aet] 
   [Yuriy Basalik 75, Vladimir Fedotov 113 – Nekhanov 32] 
 ŽALGIRIS Vilnius              4-0  Lokomotiv Chelyabinsk 
   [Leonardas Žukauskas, Petras Glodenis, Romualdas Juska, Kaledinskas] 
 [Aug 6] 
 SPARTAK Moskva                1-0  Kayrat Alma-Ata 
   [Gennadiy Logofet 74] 
 [Aug 10] 
 DINAMO Kiev                   4-1  Neftyanik Baku  
   [Viktor Kanevskiy 4, 28, 53, Andrei Biba 46 – Anatoliy Banishevskiy 82] 
 [Aug 15] 
 DINAMO Moskva                 2-1  Dinamo Tbilisi              [aet] 
   [Valeriy Fadeyev 19, Viktor Anichkin 112 – Ilya Datunashvili 82]

Quarterfinals
 [Jun 21] 
 KRYLYA SOVETOV Kuibyshev      1-0  SKA Lvov 
   [Nikolai Osyanin 15] 
 [Aug 29] 
 DINAMO Moskva                 2-0  CSKA Moskva 
   [Igor Chislenko 60, Yuriy Vshivtsev 80] 
 Shinnik Yaroslavl             1-3  DINAMO Kiev 
   [Vladimir Atamanychev 85 – Andrei Biba 17, Valentin Levchenko 72, Viktor Kanevskiy 76] 
 [Aug 30] 
 SPARTAK Moskva                1-0  Žalgiris Vilnius 
   [Galimzyan Husainov 15]

Semifinals
 [Sep 7] 
 Dinamo Moskva                 2-3  KRYLYA SOVETOV Kuibyshev  
   [Valeriy Maslov 23, Eduard Mudrik 79 pen – Anatoliy Kikin 42, 46, Nikolai Osyanin 49] 
 [Sep 8] 
 Spartak Moskva                0-0  Dinamo Kiev

Semifinals replays 
 [Sep 9] 
 Spartak Moskva                2-3  DINAMO Kiev 
   [Galimzyan Husainov 14, Igor Netto 64 – Oleg Bazilevich 43, 56, Viktor Serebryanikov 58]

Final

External links
 Complete calendar. helmsoccer.narod.ru
 1964 Soviet Cup. Footballfacts.ru
 1964 Soviet football season. RSSSF

Soviet Cup seasons
Cup
Soviet Cup
Soviet Cup